Juan Pablo Varsky is an Argentine sports journalist. He works at the newspaper La Nación, at the TV program "Más que Fútbol" and the radio program "No somos nadie". He made a cameo in the 2012 Argentine telenovela Graduados.

References

1970 births
Living people
People from Buenos Aires
Argentine people of Russian-Jewish descent
Argentine Jews
Argentine sports journalists
Argentine radio presenters
Argentine television presenters